Plunder is a 1923 American drama film serial directed by George B. Seitz. During the production of this serial, on August 10, 1922, John Stevenson, a stuntman for Pearl White, was killed doing a stunt from a moving bus to an elevated platform. The film survives in the UCLA Film and Television Archive and a trailer is preserved at the Library of Congress.

Cast
 Pearl White as Pearl Travers
 Warren William as Mr. Jones (credited as Warren Krech)
 Harry Semels as Jud Deering
 Tom McIntyre
 William Nally
 Wally Oettel
 Edward J. Pool
 Charles 'Patch' Revada

Chapter titles
 The Bandaged Man
 Held By the Enemy
 The Hidden Thing
 Ruin
 To Beat a Knave
 Heights of Hazard
 Mocked from the Grave
 The Human Target
 Game Clear Through
 Against Time
 Spunk
 Under the Floor
 Swamp of Lost Souls
 The Madman
 A King's Ransom

See also
 List of film serials
 List of film serials by studio

References

External links

Stills at silenthollywood.com

1923 films
1923 drama films
Silent American drama films
American silent serial films
American black-and-white films
Films directed by George B. Seitz
Treasure hunt films
1920s American films
Silent adventure films